Betaenone C, like other betaenones (A and B), is a secondary metabolite isolated from the fungus Pleospora betae, a plant pathogen. Of the seven phytotoxins isolated in fungal leaf spots from sugar beet (Beta vulgaris), it showed 89% growth inhibition. Betaenone C has been shown to act by inhibiting RNA and protein synthesis.

References 

Decalins
Tertiary alcohols
Cyclic ketones
Primary alcohols
3-Hydroxypropenals